The Austrian ice hockey championship (in German: Österreichische Eishockey-Meister) has been awarded to men since 1923, and for women since 1999.

Women's
 1999 Gipsy Girls Villach (Villach)
 2000 Gipsy Girls Villach (Villach)
 2001 EHC Vienna Flyers (Vienna)
 2002 EHV Sabres (Vienna)
 2003 EHV Sabres (Vienna)
 2004 EHV Sabres (Vienna)
 2005 EHV Sabres (Vienna)
 2006 Ravens Salzburg (Salzburg)
 2007 EHV Sabres (Vienna)
 2008 EHV Sabres (Vienna)
 2009 Ravens Salzburg (Salzburg)
 2010 EHV Sabres (Vienna)
 2011 EHV Sabres (Vienna)
 2012 EHV Sabres (Vienna)
 2013 EHV Sabres (Vienna)
 2014 EHV Sabres (Vienna)
 2015 EHV Sabres (Vienna)
 2016 EHV Sabres (Vienna)
 2017 EHV Sabres (Vienna)

Men's

See also
Austrian Hockey League (Österreichische Eishockey-Liga)
Austria women's ice hockey Bundesliga (Dameneishockey-Bundesliga)
 List of German ice hockey champions

Cham